Leah Donna Dizon (born September 24, 1986) is a former American singer, model and media personality. After moving to Japan in early 2006 to pursue an entertainment career, she made her recording debut on Victor Entertainment later that same year.

Biography

1986–2004: Childhood and youth
Leah Donna Dizon was born in Las Vegas, Nevada, on September 24, 1986. Her mother is of French descent while her father is of Filipino Chinese descent. Her parents worked as casino dealers. Dizon is the fourth of six children: she has two older brothers, an older sister, and two younger brothers. In an interview, she explains that she listened to rock and R&B music and trained in dance since the age of 12. Dizon has said that her mother was "very strict and monitored [Dizon's] spending habits". When she was 14 years old, she worked at a clothing store and eventually saved enough money to travel to Japan alone for a trip.

She attended the Las Vegas Academy of Performing Arts for her freshman and sophomore years but graduated from the public Eldorado High School in 2004, where she became active in theater. At the age of 18, Dizon relocated to Los Angeles, California and attended college as a film major for her freshman year.

2005–2007: Destiny Line, early work, and career debut
While living in Los Angeles, Dizon worked as a promotional model for local car shows. Eventually, her photographs were posted online. It was reported that there were 2 million Google hits within an entire year, with the majority of the viewers being located in China and Japan. Much of the attention received was attributed to her unique looks. She was asked by many Japanese fans—who had seen her photographs—to work in their country, which eventually prompted her to submit several demo tapes and dance videos to Victor Entertainment. An agent offered and signed her to a recording contract.

In March 2006, Dizon moved to Tokyo and began Japanese lessons alongside voice training. She released her first photobook, Petite Amie (which means "girlfriend" in French), in October 2006—Petite Amie was ranked as the third best-selling photobook of 2006 and 2007. A few pictorials for various magazines followed.

Dizon made her musical debut under Victor Entertainment on February 14, 2007, with the single "Softly". This was followed by "Koi Shiyō", and "L・O・V・E U". which also peaked at number 7 on the Oricon Weekly Chart. Koi Shiyō was used in a Lotte TV advert, while "Could you be that one?" was featured in a PlayStation 3 Ninja Gaiden Sigma TV advert, with Dizon starring in both commercials. In September 2007, Dizon released her debut album, Destiny Line, under Victor Entertainment. The CD+DVD Edition contains 14 tracks, 10 of which she penned herself on the single PVs alongside a special album PV "Again and Again". The CD+1 only edition contains the digitally-released remix of "Koi Shiyō", called "Koi Shiyō (Yasutaka Nakata-Capsule Mix)".

2008–2011: Communication!!!, marriage, and pregnancy
After the release of Destiny Line, Dizon continued with two singles: "Love Paradox" and "Vanilla" (both 2008). Her second album, Communication!!!, was released in August 2008. "Under the Same Sky" was used as the theme song for the Japanese drama Tokyo Prom Queen, while "Lost At Sea" was used for season 2. She made a guest appearance on the show as Naomi, the prom queen from the previous year, through photos and video snippets.

In February 2008, Dizon began dating her stylist Bun (born 1979), whom she had met while shooting the music video for "Love Paradox". On October 10, 2008, three months pregnant, Dizon married Bun in a traditional Japanese ceremony. These initial stages were chronicled and announced during her Communication!!! Album Tour several days after the marriage. The couple's daughter was born in April 2009.

On February 14, 2010, Dizon appeared on live television, claiming that her marriage had been troubled ever since the birth.  On October 31, 2010, she announced that she and Bun had separated and filed for divorce earlier that month, and she was seeking full custody of their child. According to Dizon, the split was due to "busy schedules and inability to meet regularly differing opinions toward raising children" alongside "irreconcilable differences". According to a statement released on February 22, 2011, by Dizon's agency, Dizon received full custody of their daughter Mila and details of their arrangement were private. Their divorce was finalized in December 2010. Dizon subsequently attended the Stella Adler Studio of Acting in New York City, where she graduated in December 2012. After graduating, Dizon stated that she would like to return to Japan for work in the future.

In June 2011, Dizon filmed commercials in Manhattan for Shonan Cosmetic Surgery Clinic.

2012–present: Return to Japan
On December 14, 2012, Dizon announced that she had signed a contract with a talent agency in the US, and would also be accepting any offers for Japanese work if she were to receive any. The magazine Joseijishin reported in June 2013 that Dizon's ex-husband Bun had stopped paying child support for their daughter, which was the main reason Dizon returned to Japan, before moving to Las Vegas with her mother and daughter.

As of 2018, Dizon was a senior at Nevada State University, majoring in social psychology, and had plans to attend graduate school.

Discography

Albums

Mini-albums

Singles

Concert DVDs 
 Live Communication!!! (2008)

Video game soundtracks
 "Everlasting Love + You" (Katamari Forever) (2009)
 "Bomb a Head!" (Samurai & Dragons version ft. Leah Dizon) (Samurai & Dragons) (2013)

Filmography

Film  
 Traffic in the Sky (トラフィック・イン・ザ・スカイ) (2007)
 Kiba Gaiden (呀＜KIBA＞ ～暗黒騎士鎧伝～) (2011)

Television 
 Webtama as a co-host (2007)
 Sakigake Ongaku Banzuke Vegas as host (2007)
 J-Melo as host (2007)

Plays 
 Words Yakusoku / Uragiri: Subete, Ushinawareshi Mono no Tame (2009)
 To Drop Atomic Bombs on Hiroshima (2009)

See also
Americans in Japan
Magibon

References

External links

 Leah Dizon Official Blog 
Leah Dizon at Tokyo Rabbit Records
Leah Dizon at Victor Entertainment 
 

1986 births
Living people
American expatriates in Japan
American women pop singers
American musicians of Chinese descent
American musicians of Filipino descent
American people of French descent
Expatriate television personalities in Japan
J-pop singers
Musicians from Las Vegas
Victor Entertainment artists
American models of Filipino descent
American models of Chinese descent
21st-century American women singers
21st-century American singers